The Godié language is a Kru language spoken by the Godié people in the south-west and central-west of Ivory Coast. It is one of the dialects of the Bété language, In 1993, the language had 26,400 native speakers.

Writing 
Godié spelling is based on the rules of The Orthographic Conventions for Ivorian Languages created by the Institut de linguistique appliquée (ILA) of the Université Félix Houphouët-Boigny. This convention has had revisions.

The tone is indicated with an apostrophe for the high tone and the minus sign for the low tone before the syllable.

References

Linguistic literature
Marchese, Lynell. "On the role of conditionals in Godie procedural discourse." Coherence and Grounding in Discourse (1987): 263-280.
Marchese, Lynell. "Subordinate clauses as topics in Godie." Studies in African Linguistics, Supplement 7 (1977): 157-164.
Marchese, Lynell. "Tense innovation in the Kru language family." Studies in African linguistics 15, no. 2 (1984): 189ff.

Bété languages
Languages of Ivory Coast